The 2021 World Armwrestling Championship was the 42nd edition of the  World Armwrestling Championship held in Bucharest, Romania from 24 November to 3 December.
The event was supposed to be held from 18 to 27 September 2020 in Batumi, Georgia. It was later postponed and then moved to another location. Georgian Armwrestling Federation was disqualified by the WAF Executive Board because of failing to organize the 2021 World Armwrestling Championship.

Medal summary

Medal table

Medalists

Men

Left arm

Right arm

Women

Left arm

Right arm

External links
Results Book

References

2021 in Romanian sport
World Armwrestling
World Amwrestling
2021
Sports competitions in Bucharest